Gizzeria is an Arbëreshë comune and town in the province of Catanzaro in the Calabria region of Italy.

Overview
Gizzeria shares borders in common with the municipalities of Falerna, Nocera Terinese, Lamezia Terme and the Tyrrhenian Sea.

The town's territory is within 5 minutes driving distance from the Lamezia Terme International Airport, as well as 10 minutes driving distance from the Lamezia Terme Centrale train station.

See also
 Lago La Vota

Notes and references

External links

Arbëresh settlements
Cities and towns in Calabria